Bersa is an Argentine arms manufacturer, located in the city of Ramos Mejía in Argentina.

History 

The company was founded in the mid-1950s by Italian immigrants Benso Bonadimani, Ercole Montini and Savino Caselli, all of them mechanical engineers. Montini worked for Beretta in Italy. At the beginning they were producing parts for the now defunct Argentinian arms manufacturer Ballester–Molina. Their first handgun was a modified version of a Ballester model which they called "Luan", combining the first two letters of the last names of the 2 designers of the pistol, Luce and Antonovich. The gun did not have much commercial success and very few of them were produced; nowadays they are quite rare collector's items.

In 1959 the first 22 Long Rifle pistol was commercialized, called "Modelo 60", which later evolved in the "Modelo 62", and based on a modified Beretta design, it sold extremely well. In 1960 the name "Bersa" was introduced, taken from the initial letters of the founders' first names. Many more successful models in increasingly more powerful calibers were produced in the following years, making Bersa a well-known and respected name in the firearms world. In 1989 the first full-size combat pistol was introduced, the Model 90, chambered for the 9×19mm Parabellum cartridge.

In 1994 a new model name for the entire production line was introduced, "Thunder", followed by a number indicating the handgun caliber. However, the Thunder series in reality includes two totally different designs in mechanics and appearances; for cartridges up to and including the .380 ACP, the handguns are compact in size and based on a blowback system. For more powerful rounds, starting with the 9×19mm Parabellum, the Thunder line is based on a locked breech and short-recoil modified Browning design.

At the end of the 1990s Bersa won the contract for supplying a new standard sidearm for the Argentine Armed Forces and Argentine Federal Police that were looking to replace their aging Browning Hi-Power pistols. The Bersa Thunder 9, an evolution of the Model 90, was chosen.

In the past Bersa also produced .22 Long Rifle caliber long guns and single- and double-barreled shotguns, but they did not have the same commercial success of the pistols, and they have been discontinued.

Bersa is currently one of the largest privately owned corporations in Argentina. It produces, among many handguns, the very popular Bersa Thunder 380 and the Bersa Thunder 9 pistols and the Ultra Compact series of the Thunder chambered in 9mm, .40 S&W, and .45 ACP.

Overview 
The compact Thunder 22, 32, and 380 are similar to the Walther PPK, while the full-size Thunder 9, 40, 45 and are somewhat similar in appearance and some mechanical aspects to the Walther P88.

The Thunder 22 pistol chambered for the 22 Long Rifle cartridge is widely used among recreational shooters in North and South America, and the Thunder 22–6, a longer-barreled version of this pistol, is used in high-level competitions.

The compact Thunder pistols sell very well in countries that ban the use of more powerful cartridges for civilian personal defense purposes. The Thunder 380 is popular in the US market as a small and light, easy concealable, high-quality and competitively priced personal defense handgun.

The full-size Thunder combat pistol is the standard sidearm of the Argentina Armed Forces (Thunder 9), the Argentina Federal Police (Thunder 9), the Buenos Aires Provincial Police (Thunder 9) and several other law enforcement agencies (Thunder 9 and 40).

Bersa as of 2019 introduced an eight-shot, single-stack 9mm-chambered polymer pistol called the BP9CC. This is a striker-fired pistol versus the hammer-fired Thunders. The BP9CC has a double-action trigger. The BP9CC also includes the locking barrel design. Versions chambered in .380 ACP and .40 S&W are also available.

Handguns
Bersa 83
Bersa 85
Bersa 86
Bersa 223 DA
Bersa Thunder 22
Bersa Thunder 22-6
Bersa Thunder 32
Bersa Thunder 380
Bersa Thunder 380 Concealed Carry
Bersa Thunder 380 Plus
Bersa 383a
Bersa Thunder 9
Bersa Thunder 40
Bersa Thunder 40 HD
Bersa Thunder 9 Ultra Compact
Bersa Thunder 40 Ultra Compact
Bersa Thunder 45 Ultra Compact
Bersa BP 380 Concealed Carry
Bersa BP 9 Concealed Carry
Bersa BP 40 Concealed Carry
Bersa TPR9

References

Notes

Bibliography

External links
Official Website
Bersa/Firestorm Parts
Eagle Imports Official Website
Bersa history (in Spanish)
All the Bersa models during the years
Bersa Warranty Repair Center
Bersa Chat Forum - Front Page

 
Defense companies of Argentina
Firearm manufacturers of Argentina